This is a list of football transfers involving teams from the Argentine Primera División for the 2007–08 season.

June–August window

Argentinos Juniors
In
 Roberto Battión from  Unión
 Martín Cabrera from  Olimpo
 Alejandro Delorte from  Brescia
 Sergio Escudero from  Independiente
 Leandro Fleitas from  Olimpo (loan return)
 Juan Ignacio Mercier from  Platense
 Diego Morales from  All Boys (loan return)
 Gabriel Peñalba from  Cagliari
 Álvaro Pereira from  Quilmes
 Andrés Romero from  Ben Hur
 Juan Sabia from  Gimnasia de Jujuy
 Roberto Nicolás Saucedo from  C.F. Ciudad Juárez
Out
 Juan Pablo Avendaño to  Kayserispor
 Facundo Bonvín to  Platense
 Sebastián Brunet to  Ferro (loan)
 Gabriel Bustos to  Aldosivi
 Fernando Cáceres (retired)
 Sebastián Carrera to  Arsenal
 Lucio Ceresetto to  Ben Hur
 Gonzalo Choy to  Morelia
 Matías Córdoba to  Tigre (loan)
 Pablo De Muner to  Polideportivo Ejido
 Leandro Desábato to  Estudiantes LP (end of loan)
 Leandro Martínez to  All Boys
 Leonel Núñez to  Olympiacos F.C.
 Facundo Pérez Castro to  Gimnasia de Jujuy
 Marcelo Pontiroli to  Quilmes
 Marcelo Sarmiento to  Larissa F.C.

Arsenal de Sarandí
In
 Martín Andrizzi from  Banfield
 Leonardo Biagini from  Albacete
 Ariel Bogado from  Nacional de Asunción
 Mariano Brau from  Tecos UAG B (loan return)
 José Luis Calderón from  Estudiantes LP
 Sebastián Carrera from  Argentinos Juniors
 Alexander Corro from  Atlanta
 Israel Damonte from  Nueva Chicago
 Christian Díaz from  Huracán
 Aníbal Matellán from  Gimnàstic
 Josimar Mosquera from  Estudiantes LP
 Leonardo Ulloa from  San Lorenzo (loan)
 Diego Villar from  Godoy Cruz
 Andrés Yllana from  Belgrano
Out
 Cristian Castillo to  Atlanta
 Esteban Dreer to  FBK Kaunas
 Luis Pedro Figueroa to  Banfield
 Bryan Gerzycich to  Hapoel Haifa
 Cristian Llama to  Catania
 Gabriel Loeschbor to  Gimnasia de Jujuy
 Javier Lux to  Belgrano
 Pablo Mouche to  Boca Juniors (end of loan)
 Mauro Óbolo to  AIK
 Jorge Alberto Ortiz to  San Lorenzo (end of loan)
 Andrés Pérez to  Millonarios (end of loan)
 Ibrahim Sekagya to  Red Bull Salzburg
 Lucas Valdemarín to  AIK

Banfield
In
 Ariel Broggi from  Vélez Sársfield
 Esteban Buján from  Godoy Cruz (loan return)
 Nilo Carretero from  Sarmiento de Junín
 José Devaca from  Godoy Cruz
 Luis Pedro Figueroa from  Arsenal
 Diego Herner from  Gimnasia LP
 Jairo Patiño from  Atlético Nacional
 Nicolás Pavlovich from  Morelia
Out
 Martín Andrizzi to  Arsenal
 Cristian Bardaro to  Danubio F.C.
 Sebastián Brown to  Talleres
 José Chatruc to  Racing
 Hernán Díaz to  Tristán Suárez
 Guillermo Esteban to  Belgrano
 Cristian Galeazzi to  Almagro
 Carlos Galván to  Universitario
 Silvio González to  Olympiakos Nicosia
 Josemir Lujambio to  Olimpo
 Julián Maidana to  Talleres
 Ángel Morales to  Olimpo
 Hernán Pagés to  Belgrano
 Roberto Salvatierra to  Gimnasia LP
 Gastón Schmidt to  Quilmes
 Federico Tenaglia to  Juventud de Pergamino

Boca Juniors
In
 Carlos Bueno from  Sporting Lisbon
 Álvaro González from  Defensor Sporting (loan)
 Leandro Gracián from  CF Monterrey
 Pablo Mouche from  Arsenal (loan return)
 Gabriel Paletta from  Liverpool F.C.
 Fabián Vargas from  SC Internacional (loan return)
Out
 Aldo Bobadilla to  Independiente Medellín
 Daniel Díaz to  Getafe CF
 Leandro Díaz & Andrés Franzoia to  Huracán (loan)
 Guillermo Marino to  UANL Tigres (loan)
 Bruno Marioni to  Club Atlas
 Sergio Orteman to  Istanbul B.B. (loan)
 Juan Román Riquelme to  Villarreal CF (end of loan)
 Clemente Rodríguez to  RCD Espanyol (end of loan from Spartak Moscow)
 Santiago Villafañe & Juan Forlín to  Real Madrid Castilla (loan)

Colón de Santa Fe
In
 Alejandro Capurro from  Sakaryaspor (loan return)
 Martín Cardetti from  Deportivo Cali
 Darío Gandín from  Gimnasia de Jujuy (loan return)
 Ariel Garcé from  Rosario Central
 César González from  Caracas FC
 Jhonnier González from  Independiente Santa Fe
 Sebastián Prediguer from  Millonarios (loan return)
 Luis Ignacio Quinteros from  León
 Sebastián Romero from  Racing
Out
 Fernando Alloco, Martín Bravo & Sebastián Malandra to  San Martín de San Juan (loan)
 Diego Barrado to  Olimpo (end of loan from River Plate)
 Jorge Guagua to  Emelec
 Guillermo Imhoff to FC Wacker Innsbruck
 Gastón Esmerado to  UD Vecindario
 José Sand to  Lanús

Estudiantes de La Plata
In
 Julio Barroso from  Lorca
 José Basanta from  Olimpo (loan return)
 Jeremías Caggiano from  EA Guingamp
 Leandro Desábato from  Argentinos Juniors (loan return)
 Diego Galván from  River Plate
 Édgar González from  Cerro Porteño
 Iván Moreno y Fabianesi from  Vélez Sársfield
 Enzo Pérez from  Godoy Cruz
 Juan Manuel Salgueiro from  Necaxa
 César Taborda from  Defensa y Justicia (loan return)
 Lucas Wílchez from  Tigre (loan return)
Out
 Ezequiel Brítez to  Nueva Chicago (loan)
 José Luis Calderón &  Josimar Mosquera to  Arsenal
 Mauricio Casierra to  Once Caldas
 Hugo Colace to  Flamengo
 Lucio Micheli to  Temperley
 Diego Noguera to  Defensa y Justicia
 Mariano Pavone to  Real Betis
 José Sosa to  FC Bayern Munich
 Sebastián Vázquez to  FC Chornomorets Odessa
 Bruno Bianchi (released)

Gimnasia y Esgrima de Jujuy
In
 Juan Jose Arraya from  Juventud Antoniana (loan return)
 César Carranza from  Nueva Chicago
 Matías Miramontes & Maximiliano Cavalotti from  Newell's Old Boys
 Héctor Desvaux & Nereo Fernández from  Unión (loan)
 Ezequiel Garré from  Ilisiakos F.C.
 Emanuel Giménez from  Talleres
 Darío González from  Instituto
 Juan Manuel Herbella & Osvaldo Miranda from  Godoy Cruz
 Gabriel Loeschbor from  Arsenal
 Jorge Luna from  Deportivo Armenio (loan)
 Diego Mateo from  Hércules CF
 Facundo Pérez Castro from  Argentinos Juniors
 Gabriel Ruiz from  Unión
 Eric Schmil from  Juventud Antoniana
Out
 Cristian Basualdo to  Talleres
 José Luis Campi to  Talleres de Perico
 Pablo Frontini to  San Martín de San Juan
 Darío Gandín to  Colón (end of loan)
 Javier García to  Chacarita Juniors
 Gabriel Iribarren to  Dender
 Luis Medero to  Almagro
 Germán Noce to  San Martín de Tucumán
 Juan Sabia to  Argentinos Juniors
 Fernando Soler to  Platense

Gimnasia y Esgrima La Plata
In
 Pablo Batalla from  Quilmes
 Sebastián Cejas from  Colo-Colo
 Renato Civelli from  Olympique de Marseille
 Federico Domínguez from  River Plate
 Elvio Friedrich from  Almagro (loan return)
 Germán Herrera from  Real Sociedad (loan from San Lorenzo)
 Nicolás Medina from  Talleres
 Roberto Salvatierra from  Banfield
Out
 Pablo Bangardino to  Central Español (loan)
 Germán Basualdo to  Almirante Brown
 Oscar Roberto Cornejo to  Deportivo Cali
 Agustín Domenez to  Almagro (loan)
 Sebastián Dubarbier to  Olimpo
 Juan Figueroa to  Bucaramanga
 Ariel Franco to  San Martín de San Juan
 Diego Herner to  Banfield
 Juan Carlos Olave to  Belgrano
 Antonio Pacheco to  Peñarol
 Gustavo Semino to  Atlético Rafaela
 Santiago Silva to  Vélez Sársfield
 Sergio Valenti to  Defensor Sporting

Huracán
In
 Marcelo Barovero &  Walter Gómez from  Atlético Rafaela
 Alexis Castro from  Al-Ahli
 Andrés Franzoia &  Leandro Díaz from  Boca Juniors (loan)
 Sebastián Díaz from  Central Español
 Franco Mendoza from  Atlante F.C.
 Federico Nieto from  Verona
 Juan Manuel Ortiz from  Peñarol
 Ángel Puertas from  Platense
 Leonardo Romero from  Acassuso
 Alan Sánchez from  O'Higgins
 Patricio Toranzo from  Atlético Rafaela (loan from River Plate)
 Luciano Varaldo from  Central Córdoba (SdE)
 Omar Zarif from  Nueva Chicago
 Antonio Barijho (free agent)
Out
 Manuel Baigorria to  Olmedo
 Christian Díaz to  Arsenal
 Elías Gómez to  Tristán Suárez
 Joaquín Larrivey to  Cagliari
 Héctor Larroque to  Sportivo Italiano
 Mauro Milano to  Asteras Tripolis
 Lucas Nardi to  Aldosivi
 Gerardo Solana to  Godoy Cruz
 Juan Manuel Sosa to  Ferro
 Hernán Vigna to  Platense
 Leonardo Díaz,  Rodolfo Quinteros &  Héctor Núñez (released)

Independiente
In
 Sebastián Carrizo from  UD Vecindario (loan return)
 Cristian Ledesma from  Olimpia
 Lucas Mareque from  FC Porto
 Ricardo Moreira from  Rosario Central
 Matías Oyola from  Belgrano
Out
 David Abraham to  Gimnàstic (loan)
 Emiliano Armenteros to  Sevilla Atlético (loan)
 Juan Eluchans to  SM Caen
 Sergio Escudero to  Argentinos Juniors
 Sebastián Godoy to  Talleres RE
 Federico González to  Ferro (loan)
 Matías Manrique to  Peñarol
 Lucas Ojeda to  San Martín de Tucumán
 Carlos Sciucatti to  Academia F.C.
 David Solari to  Chioggia
 Oscar Ustari to  Getafe CF

Lanús
In
 Roberto Jiménez from  San Lorenzo (loan)
 Adrián Peralta from  Newell's Old Boys
 José Sand from  Colón
 Leonardo Sigali from  Nueva Chicago
 Jadson Viera from  Danubio F.C.
Out
 Javier Almirón to  Polideportivo Ejido
 Rodrigo Archubi to  Olympiacos F.C.
 Cristian Fabbiani to  CFR Cluj
 Sebastián Leto to  Liverpool F.C.
 Mauricio Romero to  Morelia
 Néstor Moiraghi (released)

Newell's Old Boys
In
 Pablo Aguilar from  Chacarita Juniors (loan)
 Diego Barreto &  Alejandro Da Silva from  Cerro Porteño
 Matías Donnet from  Belgrano
 Marcos Gutiérrez from  Olimpo
 Yony Peralta from  Durazno FC
 Juan Leandro Quiroga from  Puebla F.C.
 Santiago Salcedo from  Chiapas
 Rolando Schiavi from  Grêmio
 Diego Torres from  Quilmes
 Pablo Vázquez from  Villa Mitre
 Juan Manuel Sosa from  Ferro
Out
 Gastón Aguirre &  Lautaro Formica to  San Lorenzo
 Carlos Araujo to  Olimpo
 Sebastián Arrieta to  Racing
 Óscar Cardozo to  S.L. Benfica
 Maximiliano Cavalotti &  Matías Miramontes to  Gimnasia de Jujuy
 Mauro Cejas to  Tecos UAG
 Mauricio Chalar to  Bucaramanga
 Marcos Flores to  Unión
 Nahuel Guzmán to  Independiente Rivadavia (loan)
 Adrián Peralta to  Lanús
 Germán Rivera to  Talleres
 Mario Sosa to  Alvarado

Olimpo de Bahía Blanca
In
 Carlos Araujo from  Newell's Old Boys
 Diego Barrado from  Colón (loan from River Plate)
 Salustiano Candia &  Gustavo Pinto from  Godoy Cruz
 Juan Carlos Carrizo from  PSV Eindhoven
 Sebastián Dubarbier from  Gimnasia LP
 Sebastián González from  Veracruz
 Josemir Lujambio &  Ángel Morales from  Banfield
 Jorge Daniel Martínez &  Carlos Navarro Montoya from  Nueva Chicago
 Mariano Martínez from  Almagro
 Javier Páez from  Hapoel Tel Aviv F.C.
 Raúl Saavedra from  Quilmes
 Jorge Torales from  Olmedo
 José Ramírez from  San Lorenzo
Out
 Martín Asencio to  Los Andes
 José Basanta to  Estudiantes LP (end of loan)
 Ismael Blanco to  AEK Athens
 Diego Caballero to  Independiente Rivadavia
 Martín Cabrera to  Argentinos Juniors
 Silvio Carrario to  Aldosivi
 Leandro Fleitas to  Argentinos Juniors (end of loan)
 Federico García to  Belgrano
 Marcos Gutiérrez to  Newell's Old Boys
 Mauro Laspada to  Alvarado
 Walter Zunino to  Atlético Rafaela

Racing
In
 Sebastián Arrieta from  Newell's Old Boys
 Erwin Ávalos from  Toluca
 Darío Bottinelli from  San Lorenzo (loan)
 Hilario Navarro,  Marcos Cáceres &  Domingo Salcedo from  Cerro Porteño
 José Chatruc from  Banfield
 Maximiliano Estévez from  Antofagasta
 Reinaldo Navia from  Club Atlas
 José Shaffer from  IFK Göteborg (loan return)
Out
 Gonzalo Bergessio to  S.L. Benfica
 Diego Crosa to  Maccabi Haifa F.C.
 Fernando de la Fuente to  San Martín de San Juan
 Celso Esquivel to  San Lorenzo (end of loan)
 Pablo González to  FC Locarno (loan)
 Ezequiel Miralles to  Talleres
 Maximiliano Moralez to  FC Moscow
 Sixto Peralta to  River Plate
 Sebastián Romero to  Colón
 Sergio Romero to  AZ Alkmaar
 Juan Manuel Torres to  San Lorenzo
 Martín Vitali to  Nueva Chicago
 Francisco Maciel (released)

River Plate
In
 Sixto Peralta from  Racing
 Nicolás Sánchez & Mario Vega from  Nueva Chicago
 Alexis Sánchez from  Colo-Colo (loan from Udinese)
 Rolando Zárate from  CF Monterrey
Out
 Federico Domínguez to  Gimnasia LP
 Ernesto Farías to  FC Porto
 Diego Galván to  Estudiantes LP
 Germán Lux to  RCD Mallorca
 Fernando Pellegrino to  Cassino
 Nelson Rivas to  Inter Milan
 Rubens Sambueza to  UNAM Pumas (loan)
 José San Román to  Tigre (loan)
 Víctor Zapata to  Vélez Sársfield
 Horacio Ameli (retired)

Rosario Central
In
 Martín Arzuaga from  Godoy Cruz
 Eduardo Farías from  Sportivo Las Parejas
 Federico Martínez from  Central Español
 Mariano Messera from  Skoda Xanthi F.C.
 Emiliano Papa from  Vélez Sársfield (loan)
 Enrique Seccafien from  Tiburones Rojos de Coatzacoalcos
 José Vizcarra from  LDU Quito (loan return)
 Oswaldo Vizcarrondo from  Caracas FC
Out
 Roberto Acuña to  Olimpia
 Germán Alemanno to  Quilmes
 Gonzalo De Porras to  Olympiakos Nicosia (loan)
 Ángel Di María & Andrés Díaz to  S.L. Benfica
 Jorge Drovandi to  Newcastle Jets
 Ariel Garcé to  Colón
 Ricardo Moreira to  Independiente
 Maximiliano Re to  A.C. Siena
 Leonel Ríos to  Vélez Sársfield
 Yovanny Arrechea (released)

San Lorenzo
In
 Gastón Aguirre from  Newell's Old Boys
 Daniel Bilos from  América (loan from AS Saint-Étienne)
 Michael Díaz from  San Telmo
 Emiliano Díaz from  Platense
 Celso Esquivel from  Racing (loan return)
 Lautaro Formica from  Newell's Old Boys
 Juan Carlos Menseguez from  VfL Wolfsburg
 Walter Montillo from  Morelia (loan return)
 Jerónimo Morales Neumann from  Emelec
 Jorge Alberto Ortiz from  Arsenal (loan return)
 José Ramírez from  Ionikos F.C. (loan return)
 Bernardo Romeo from  CA Osasuna
 Juan Manuel Torres from  Racing
Out
 Darío Bottinelli to  Racing (loan)
 Roberto Jiménez to  Lanús (end of loan from Universitario)
 Ezequiel Lavezzi to  S.S.C. Napoli
 Cristian Ledesma to  Olympiacos F.C.
 Leonardo Ulloa to  Arsenal (loan)
 José Ramírez to  Olimpo (loan)

San Martín de San Juan
In
 Fernando Alloco, Martín Bravo & Sebastián Malandra from  Colón (loan)
 Ariel Carreño from  FC Thun
 Fernando de la Fuente from  Racing
 Ariel Franco from  Gimnasia LP
 Pablo Frontini from  Gimnasia de Jujuy
 Lucas Nanía from  Deportivo Pereira
 Martín Ortiz from  Defensa y Justicia
 Mariano Trípodi from  1. FC Köln
Out
 Hernán Ferri to  Gimnasia de Mendoza
 Lisandro Sacripanti to  Independiente Rivadavia
 Marcos Bolzán (released)

Tigre
In
 Lucas Alessandria from  SD Ponferradina
 Leonel Altobelli from  Barracas Bolívar
 Luis Ardente from  San Telmo
 Néstor Ayala from  Sportivo Luqueño
 Matías Córdoba from  Argentinos Juniors (loan)
 DJ Countess from  Provincial Osorno
 Sebastián Ereros from  Vélez Sársfield (loan)
 Norberto Paparatto from  Tiro Federal
 Sebastián Rusculleda from  Quilmes
 José San Román from  River Plate (loan)
 Guillermo Suárez from  Rivadavia de Lincoln
Out
 Patricio Abraham to  Platense
 Alberto Alarcón to  Defensores de Belgrano
 Sebastián Allende to  All Boys
 Darío Capogrosso to  Aldosivi
 Pablo Fontanello to  Santiago Wanderers (loan)
 Luciano Krikorián to  San Martín de Tucumán
 Juan Pablo Pereyra to  Nacional
 Luis Salmerón to  Ferro
 Aldo Visconti to  Aldosivi
 Lucas Wílchez to  Estudiantes LP (end of loan)
 Éver Zárate to  Estudiantes BA
 Javier Mazzoni (released)

Vélez Sársfield
In
 Pablo Lima from  Danubio FC
 Germán Montoya from  Belgrano
 Jorge Núñez from  Sportivo Luqueño
 Leonel Ríos from  Rosario Central
 Santiago Silva from  Gimnasia LP
 Carlos Soto from  Nueva Chicago
 Víctor Zapata from  River Plate
Out
 Ariel Broggi to  Banfield
 Lucas Castromán to  América
 Sebastián Ereros to  Tigre
 Iván Moreno y Fabianesi to  Estudiantes LP
 Emiliano Papa to  Rosario Central (loan)
 Maximiliano Pellegrino to  Atalanta B.C. (loan)
 Lucas Quinteros (released)
 Javier Robles to  Santiago Wanderers (loan)
 Gastón Sessa to  Barcelona SC
 Marco Torsiglieri to  Talleres (loan)
 Juan Manuel Varea to  Deportivo Español
 Alejandro Verón to  Almirante Brown
 Mauro Zárate to  Al-Sadd

January window

Argentinos Juniors
In
 Sebastián Brunet from  Ferro (loan return)
 Ignacio Canuto from  Unión de Santa Fe
 Milovan Mirosevic from  Beitar Jerusalem F.C.
 Sebastián Torrico from  Godoy Cruz
 Bruno Urribarri from  Boca Juniors
Out
 Franco Niell to  D.C. United (loan)
 Mauro Bogado to  Instituto de Córdoba (loan)
 Nicolás Navarro to  S.S.C. Napoli
 Roberto Nicolás Saucedo to  UA Maracaibo
 Santiago Kuhl to  FC Locarno

Arsenal de Sarandí
In
 Carlos Báez from  Independiente (loan)
 Luciano Leguizamón from  Gimnasia LP
 Cristian Pellerano from  Racing
Out
 Israel Damonte to  Asteras Tripolis
 Gastón Filgueira to  Nacional
 Santiago Raymonda to  Veracruz
 Leonardo Ulloa to  Olimpo (end of loan from San Lorenzo)
 Andrés Yllana to  Nueva Chicago
 Franco Caraccio to  Houston Dynamo
 Ariel Bogado to  Nacional
 Diego Villar to  Gimnasia LP

Banfield
In
 Andrés Díaz from  S.L. Benfica (loan)
 Martín Rodríguez from  River Plate Montevideo
Out
 Enrique Bologna to  Alianza Lima (loan)
 Esteban Buján to  Albacete Balompié
 Luis Pedro Figueroa to  Cobreloa
 Cristian Maidana to  FC Spartak Moscow
 Alejandro Salinas to  Nacional 
 Pablo Vitti to  Independiente

Boca Juniors
In
 Julio César Cáceres from  UANL Tigres
 Lucas Castroman from  América (loan)
 Juan Román Riquelme from  Villarreal CF
Out
 Éver Banega to  Valencia CF
 Carlos Bueno to  Peñarol
 Matías Cahais to  FC Groningen 
 Juan Krupoviesa to  Marseille (loan)
 Marcos Mondaini to  Barcelona SC
 Matías Silvestre to  Catania (loan)
 Mariano Torres &  Matías Rodríguez to  LASK Linz (loan)
 Bruno Urribarri to  Argentinos Juniors
 Nicolás Bertolo to  Nacional (loan)

Colón de Santa Fe
In
 Pablo Aguilar from  Sportivo Luqueño
 César Carignano from  FC Basel
 Hernán Encina from  Atlas
 Juan José Morales from  San Martín de Tucumán
 Rodrigo Díaz from  Independiente
 Esteban Fuertes from  Universidad Católica (loan return)
Out
 Emanuel Centurión to  Atlas
 Esteban González to  UD Las Palmas
 Freddy Grisales to  Independiente
 Luis Ignacio Quinteros to  Gimnasia LP
 Martín Troncoso &  Emiliano Ciucci to  Defensa y Justicia (loan)
 Jhonnier González to  Independiente Santa Fe
 Omar Merlo to  River Plate (loan)

Estudiantes de La Plata
In
 Ezequiel Brítez from  Nueva Chicago (loan return)
 Cristian Bogado from  Nacional
 Juan Manuel Díaz from  Liverpool de Montevideo
 Leandro Lázzaro from  Tigre
 Cristian Cellay from  Huracán
Out
 Pablo Álvarez to  Catania
 Jeremías Caggiano to  Albacete
 Sebastián Domínguez to  América

Gimnasia y Esgrima de La Plata
In
 Pablo Bangardino from  Central Español (loan return)
 Agustín Domenez from  Almagro (loan return)
 Diego Alonso from  Shanghai United F.C.
 Luis Ignacio Quinteros from  Colón de Santa Fe
 Diego Villar from  Arsenal de Sarandí
Out
 Pablo Batalla to  Quilmes
 Juan Cupertino to  Sportivo Barracas
 Germán Herrera to  Corinthians (end of loan from San Lorenzo)
 Luciano Leguizamón to  Arsenal de Sarandí
 Sebastián Cejas (released)

Gimnasia y Esgrima de Jujuy
In
 Federico Acuña from  Tacuary
 Luciano De Bruno from  AEL Limassol
 Gastón Montero from  Vélez Sársfield (loan)
 Diego Miranda from  12 de Octubre
 Luis Miguel Escalada from  Botafogo

Out
 Marcelo Berza to  Belgrano de Córdoba
 Osvaldo Miranda to  Dinamo Bucharest
 Darío González,  Emanuel Giménez &  Ezequiel Garré (released)

Huracán
In
 Carlos Arano from  Polideportivo Ejido
 Eduardo Domínguez from  Independiente Medellín
 Francisco Maciel (free agent)
Out
 Walter Gómez to  Ferro
 Juan Manuel Ortiz to  C.A. Cerro
 Leonardo Romero to  Acassuso
 Cristian Cellay to  Estudiantes de La Plata
 Sebastián Díaz to  Defensor Sporting
 Luciano Varaldo to  Almirante Brown
 Germán Zarza to  Comunicaciones
 Claudio Ubeda and  Raúl Gordillo (retired)

Independiente
In
 Freddy Grisales from  Colón de Santa Fe
 Damian Ledesma from  Rosario Central
 Pablo Vitti from  Banfield
Out
 Carlos Báez to  Arsenal de Sarandí (loan)
 José Alcides Moreno to  Steaua București (loan)
 Rodrigo Díaz to  Colón de Santa Fe
 Leandro Mussín to  Luján

Lanús
In
 Iván Macalik from  Ferro
Out
 Marcos Aguirre to  Real Valladolid
 Roberto Jiménez to  Universitario (end of loan from San Lorenzo)
 Diego Manicero  to  Racing (loan)
 Walter Ribonetto to  Rosario Central

Newell's Old Boys
In
 Nicolás Cabrera from  Racing
 Juan Carlos Ferreyra from  Deportivo Cuenca
 Cristian Llama from  Catania (loan)
 Diego Scotti from  Audax Italiano
Out
 Cristian Ansaldi to  Rubin Kazan
 Diego Barreto to  Cerro Porteño (loan)
 Yony Peralta to  Tiro Federal
 José Luis Villagra to  O'Higgins
 Emanuel Lazzarini to  Temperley

Olimpo
In
 Ignacio Ithurralde from  Monterrey
 Javier Robles from  Santiago Wanderers (loan from Vélez Sársfield)
 David Solari from  Chioggia
 Leonardo Ulloa from  Arsenal de Sarandí (loan from San Lorenzo)
Out
 Salustiano Candia to  CD Veracruz
 Sebastián Dubarbier to  CFR Cluj
 Sebastián González to  Tecos UAG
 Carlos Navarro Montoya (released)
 David Solari to  Espoli

Racing Club
In
 Luis Benítez from  Santiago Wanderers (loan return)
 Roberto Bonet from  Olimpia
 Diego Manicero from  Lanús (loan)
 Maximiliano Moralez from  FC Moscow (loan)
 Bernardo Leyenda from  River Plate
Out
 Gustavo Cabral to  River Plate
 Nicolás Cabrera to Newell's Old Boys
 Darío Bottinelli to  Universidad Católica (end of loan from San Lorenzo)
 Claudio López to  Kansas City Wizards
 Cristian Pellerano to  Arsenal de Sarandí
 Martín Romagnoli to  Toluca
 Domingo Salcedo to  Colo-Colo

River Plate
In
 Sebastián Abreu from  UANL Tigres
 Rodrigo Archubi from  Olympiacos F.C.
 Gustavo Cabral from  Racing
 Omar Merlo from  Colón de Santa Fe (loan)
Out
 Fernando Belluschi to  Olympiacos F.C.
 René Lima to  Maccabi Haifa F.C. (loan)
 Gonzalo Ludueña to  Emelec
 Federico Lussenhoff to  Talleres de Córdoba
 Sixto Peralta to  CFR Cluj
 Marco Rubén to  Recreativo Huelva
 Carlos Valencia to  Dijon FCO
 Rolando Zárate to  Barcelona SC
 Bernardo Leyenda to  Racing

Rosario Central
In
 Ramiro Fassi from  Sporting Cristal
 Maximiliano Pérez from  Fénix
 Jesús Méndez from  St. Gallen
 Walter Ribonetto from  Lanús
Out
 Juan Manuel Azconzábal to  UD Las Palmas
 Juan Grabowski to  Oriente Petrolero (loan)
 Damián Ledesma to   Independiente
 Enrique Seccafien to  Tiburones Rojos de Veracruz
 Oswaldo Vizcarrondo to  Caracas FC
 Claudio Velázquez to  José Gálvez

San Lorenzo
In
 Gonzalo Bergessio from  S.L. Benfica
 Andrés D'Alessandro from  Real Zaragoza (loan)
 Diego Placente from  Celta de Vigo
Out
 Gastón Fernández to  UANL Tigres
 Osmar Ferreyra to  Dnipro Dnipropetrovsk
 Walter Montillo to  Universidad de Chile
 Celso Esquivel to  Sportivo Luqueño
 Jerónimo Morales Neumann to  Instituto
 Jorge Alberto Ortiz to  AIK

San Martín (SJ)
In
 Daniel Giménez from  Cobreloa
 Julio César Irrazábal from  Nacional
 Ezequiel Medrán from  Lobos de la BUAP (loan from Boca Juniors)
 Carlos Recalde from  Guaraní
 Pedro Galván from  Olmedo
Out
 Fernando Alloco to  Defensa y Justicia (end of loan from Colón)
 Sebastián Malandra to  Ben Hur
 Facundo Torres to  Instituto de Córdoba
 Ariel Carreño to  Millonarios
 Mariano Trípodi to  Santos
 Gabriel Roth to  Bucaramanga
 César Monasterio to  Belgrano de Córdoba
 Maximiliano Kondratiuk (released)

Tigre
In
 Miguel Angel Cuellar from  Sol de América
 Pablo Fontanello from  Santiago Wanderers (loan return)
Out
 Matías Córdoba to  Real Salt Lake (end of loan from Argentinos Juniors)
 Alexis Ferrero to  Botafogo
 Leandro Lázzaro to  Estudiantes de La Plata
 DJ Countess (released)

Vélez Sársfield
In
 Patricio Pérez from  Everton de Viña del Mar (loan return)
 Waldo Ponce from  Universidad de Chile
 Luciano Vella from  Cádiz CF (loan)Out'''
 Mario Méndez to  Toluca
 Gastón Montero to  Gimnasia y Esgrima de Jujuy (loan)
 Franco Razzotti to  Sporting Cristal
 Ariel Rojas to  Godoy Cruz (loan)
 Emmanuel Fernandes Francou to  Olimpia (loan)
 Jorge Núñez to  Guaraní (loan)

References

2007-08
Football transfers summer 2007
Football transfers winter 2007–08
Transfers